The 2014 Interim Union Budget of India was presented by Finance Minister, P.Chidambaram on 17 February 2014, 11 AM  publicly to the citizens of the India.

References

Union budgets of India
2014 in Indian economy
India
Manmohan Singh administration